Chibal may refer to:
 Chibhal, a region and a former princely state in Kashmir
 Chi Bal, a village and commune in Srey Santhor District, Cambodia
 Chibal, a descent group among the Maya